Katua (Ca Tua) is an Austroasiatic language of Vietnam.

References

Languages of Vietnam
Bahnaric languages